In phonetics and linguistics, a phone is any distinct speech sound or gesture, regardless of whether the exact sound is critical to the meanings of words.

In contrast, a phoneme is a speech sound in a given language that, if swapped with another phoneme, could change one word to another. Phones are absolute and are not specific to any language, but phonemes can be discussed only in reference to specific languages.

However, the difference between the  sounds in pun (with aspiration) and spun (without aspiration) never affects the meaning or identity of a word in English.

As seen in the examples, phonemes, rather than phones, are usually the features of speech that are mapped onto the characters of an orthography.

Overview
In the context of spoken languages, a phone is an unanalyzed sound of a language. A phone is a speech segment that possesses distinct physical or perceptual properties and serves as the basic unit of phonetic speech analysis. Phones are generally either vowels or consonants.

A phonetic transcription (based on phones) is enclosed within square brackets, rather than the slashes of a phonemic transcription, (based on phonemes). Phones (and often also phonemes) are commonly represented by using symbols of the International Phonetic Alphabet (IPA).

The word pin has three phones. (The precise features shown in a phonetic representation depend on whether a narrow or broad transcription is used and which features the writer wishes to draw attention to in a particular context.)

When phones are considered to be realizations of the same phoneme, they are called allophones of that phoneme (more information on the methods of making such assignments can be found under phoneme).

Connection to orthography 
Whether a direct mapping between phonemes and characters is achieved depends on the type of orthography used, phonological orthographies like the Indonesian orthography tend to have one-to-one mappings of phonemes to characters whereas alphabetic orthographies like the English orthography tend to try to have direct mappings but end up mapping one phoneme to multiple characters often.

In the examples above the characters enclosed in square brackets: "pʰ" and "p" are IPA representations of phones. The IPA unlike English and Indonesian is not a practical orthography and is used by linguists to obtain phonetic transcriptions of words in spoken languages and is therefore a strongly phonetically spelled system by design.

See also 

 Emic unit
 Index of phonetics articles

References

Bibliography
 
 
 
 

Phonetics
Phonology